A road trip, sometimes spelled roadtrip, is a long-distance journey traveled by automobile.

History

First road trips by automobile

The world's first recorded long-distance road trip by the automobile took place in Germany in August 1888 when Bertha Benz, the wife of Karl Benz, the inventor of the first patented motor car (the Benz Patent-Motorwagen), traveled from Mannheim to Pforzheim (a distance of ) in the third experimental Benz motor car (which had a maximum speed of ) and back, with her two teenage sons Richard and Eugen, but without the consent and knowledge of her husband.

Her official reason was that she wanted to visit her mother but unofficially she intended to generate publicity for her husband's invention (which had only been used on short test drives before), which succeeded as the automobile took off greatly afterward and the Benz's family business eventually evolved into the present-day Mercedes-Benz company.

Presently there is a dedicated signposted scenic route in Baden-Württemberg called the Bertha Benz Memorial Route to commemorate her historic first road trip.

First road trip in North America

The first successful North American transcontinental trip by automobile took place in 1903 and was piloted by H. Nelson Jackson and Sewall K. Crocker, accompanied by a dog named Bud. The trip was completed using a 1903 Winton Touring Car, dubbed "Vermont" by Jackson. The trip took a total of 63 days between San Francisco and New York, costing US$8,000. The total cost included items such as food, gasoline, lodging, tires, parts, other supplies, and the cost of the Winton.

The first woman to cross the American landscape by car was Alice Huyler Ramsey with three female passengers in 1909. Ramsey left from Hell's Gate in Manhattan, New York and traveled 59 days to San Francisco, California.
Ramsey was followed in 1910 by Blanche Stuart Scott, who is often mistakenly cited as the first woman to make the cross-country journey by automobile East-to-West (but was a true pioneer in aviation).

Expansion of highways in the United States

New highways in the early 20th century helped propel automobile travel in the United States, primarily cross-country travel. Commissioned in 1926, and completely paved near the end of the 1930s, U.S. Route 66 is a living icon of early modern road tripping.

Motorists ventured cross-country for holiday as well as migrating to California and other locations. The modern American road trip began to take shape in the late 1930s and into the 1940s, ushering in an era of a nation on the move.

The 1950s saw the rapid growth of ownership of automobiles by American families. The automobile, now a trusted mode of transportation, was being widely used for not only commuting but leisure trips as well.

As a result of this new vacation-by-road style, many businesses began to cater to road-weary travelers.  More reliable vehicles and services made long-distance road trips easier for families, as the length of time required to cross the continent was reduced from months to days. Within one week, the average family can travel to destinations across North America.

The greatest change to the American road trip was the start, and subsequent expansion, of the Interstate Highway System. The higher speeds and controlled access nature of the Interstate allowed for greater distances to be traveled in less time and with improved safety as highways became divided.

Travelers from Europe countries, Australia, and elsewhere soon came to the US to take part in the American ideal of a road trip. Canadians also engaged in road trips taking advantage of the large size of their nation and close proximity to destinations in the United States.

Possible motivations
Many people may go on road trips for recreational purpose (e.g. sightseeing or to reach a desired location, typically during a vacation period; e.g., in the US, driving to Disneyland from Oregon). Other motivations for long-distance travel by automobile include visitation of friends and relatives, who may live far away, or relocation of one's permanent living space.

Distance and popularity

Generally, while road trips can occur in any mass of land, large masses of land are most common for road trips. The most popular locations for road trips include Australia, Canada, Mainland U.S., and Central Europe. This is because, since these areas of land are so composite, travel is more seamless, accessible, and efficient, than travel within smaller or non-contiguous, remote countries, such as Fiji, in addition to the fact that these countries tend to offer more points of interest than smaller ones. This may also be due to the distance required to qualify as a road trip, which residents of smaller bodies of land may find themselves incapable of achieving.

While there is no consensus as to what distance or time must be traveled/spent in order for the event to qualify as a road trip, it is a commonly held belief that commuting by means of automotive transportation should not qualify as a road trip, regardless of the distance. Some argue that travel may not require a set distance to qualify as a road trip.

In the United States
In the United States, a road trip typically implies leaving the state, or in extreme cases, leaving the country for places such as Canada or Mexico. However, in larger states, travel within the state may also be considered a road trip.

In terms of popularity, road trips have become loved and revered to an extent that a National Road Trip Day has been established. It is observed every Friday before Memorial Day.

In popular culture

Literature
Bill Bryson, The Lost Continent: Travels in Small-Town America (1989)
F. Scott Fitzgerald, The Cruise of the Rolling Junk (1924)
Victor H. Green published annually The Negro Motorist Green Book (also referred to as The Negro Traveler's Green Book or simply as The Green Book)
William Least Heat-Moon, Blue Highways (1982)
Jack Kerouac, On the Road (1957)
Vladimir Nabokov, Lolita (1955)
Mary Roberts Rinehart, Through Glacier Park in 1915 / Seeing America first with Howard Eaton (With Illustrations)
John Steinbeck, Travels With Charley: In Search of America (1961)
Hunter S. Thompson, Fear and Loathing in Las Vegas: A Savage Journey to the Heart of the American Dream (1971),  a roman à clef, rooted in autobiographical incidents
Mark Twain, Roughing It (1872)

Photography
In The Open Road: Photography & the American Road Trip (2014), the photography writer David Campany introduces the photographic road trip as a genre, the first book to do so.
Robert Frank, The Americans (1958) – Sean O'Hagan, writing in The Guardian, about the inclusion of The Americans as the starting point in Campany's The Open Road: Photography & the American Road Trip, said "Swiss-born Frank set out with his Guggenheim Grant to do something new and unconstrained by commercial diktats. His aim was to photograph America as it unfolded before his somewhat sombre outsider’s eye.
Ed Ruscha, Twentysix Gasoline Stations (1963)
Stephen Shore, Uncommon Places (1982) and American Surfaces (1999)

Films

Many movies and other forms of media have been made which focus upon the topic of road trips, including the namesake. Many tend to be comedic in nature, although road movies such as Easy Rider and Thelma and Louise exemplify the American dream.
Easy Rider (1969), an American road movie
National Lampoon's Vacation (1983-2015), a comedy film series initially based on filmmaker/writer John Hughes' short story "Vacation '58", that was originally published by  National Lampoon magazine. The series is distributed by Warner Bros. and consists of seven films.
Thelma & Louise (1991), an American crime drama film
 Road Trip (2000), an American road comedy film
RV (2006), an American road comedy film
The Bucket List (2007), a comedy-drama film
The Fundamentals of Caring (2016), a comedy-drama film

Music
"Born to Be Wild" by Steppenwolf
"Born to Run" by Bruce Springsteen
"Have Love Will Travel" by The Sonics
"Here I Go Again" by Whitesnake
"Life is a Highway" by Tom Cochrane
"Radar Love" by Golden Earring
"Roadhouse Blues" by The Doors
"Roadtrip" by Dream
"Road Trippin'" by Red Hot Chili Peppers
"Route 66", a popular rhythm and blues song about the cities and towns through which U.S. Route 66 passes. Since it has been released, it has been recorded by many musical artists, such as Aerosmith, Bing Crosby, Chuck Berry, The Rolling Stones, Them, Asleep at the Wheel, and Depeche Mode.
"Take it Easy" by The Eagles 
"Truckin'" by The Grateful Dead, recognized by the United States Library of Congress in 1997 as a national treasure.

See also
Driving
Grand Tour
List of roads and highways

References

External links

America on the Move

Driving
Tourist activities
Transport culture
Types of travel
Trip